Mentzelia hispida is a species of flowering plant in the family Loasaceae known by the common name pega ropa, or "sticks to clothing" in Spanish. It is native to Mexico where it grows in scrub and woodland habitats.

References

hispida
Flora of the Southwestern United States
Flora of the Sonoran Deserts
Flora of Mexico